Avkt is an old and rare Russian Christian male first name. The name is derived from the Latin name Auctus, which is in turn derived from the Latin verb augeo, meaning to multiply, to increase.

The patronymics derived from "Avkt" are "" (Avktovich; masculine) and "" (Avktovna; feminine).

References

Notes

Sources
Н. А. Петровский (N. A. Petrovsky). "Словарь русских личных имён" (Dictionary of Russian First Names). ООО Издательство "АСТ". Москва, 2005. 
А. В. Суперанская (A. V. Superanskaya). "Современный словарь личных имён: Сравнение. Происхождение. Написание" (Modern Dictionary of First Names: Comparison. Origins. Spelling). Айрис-пресс. Москва, 2005. 

